Senator Hunter may refer to:

Members of the United States Senate
John Hunter (South Carolina politician) (1750–1802), U.S. Senator from South Carolina from 1796 to 1798
Richard C. Hunter (1884–1941), U.S. Senator from Nebraska from 1934 to 1935
Robert M. T. Hunter (1809–1887), Confederate States Senator from Virginia from 1862 to 1865; U.S. Senator from Virginia from 1847 to 1861
William Hunter (senator) (1774–1849), U.S. Senator from Rhode Island from 1811 to 1821

United States state senate members
Andrew J. Hunter (1831–1913), Illinois State Senate
Andrew Hunter (Methodist preacher) (1813–1902), Arkansas State Senate (also elected U.S. Senator from Arkansas in 1866, but never seated)
Edward M. Hunter (1826–1878), Wisconsin State Senate
John F. Hunter (1896–1957), Ohio State Senate
John Hunter (Westchester County, New York) (1778–1852), New York State Senate
Jon Blair Hunter, West Virginia State Senate
Mattie Hunter (born 1954), Illinois State Senate
Thomas Hunter (New York politician) (1834–1903), New York State Senate
Tupac A. Hunter (born 1973), Michigan State Senate